"American Beautiful" is a song recorded by American country music group The Henningsens. It was released in December 2012.

Critical reception
Billy Dukes of Taste of Country gave the song three and a half stars out of five, writing that it "It’s clear there is real, reliable talent in this country threesome, and they’ve done the hard work necessary to earn a record deal and have their single released to radio."

Chart performance
"American Beautiful" debuted at Number 51 on the Country Airplay chart.

Year-end charts

References

2012 debut singles
The Henningsens songs
Songs written by Brett Beavers
Song recordings produced by Paul Worley
Arista Nashville singles
2012 songs